The Wire is an Australian current affairs radio program broadcast on community radio stations through the Community Radio Satellite.

The program, is produced by three major Australian community radio stations: Radio Adelaide (Adelaide, South Australia), 2SER (Sydney, New South Wales) and 4EB (Brisbane, Queensland)

The program promotes itself as an independent and alternative current affairs program that "offer(s) critical coverage, which challenges all points of view, putting issues and events in context and always asking 'why'".

References 

Australian radio programs